Linda Cedrone Cox (April 18, 1946 – March 10, 2008) was an American politician. She served as a Democratic member for the 86th district of the Florida House of Representatives.

Life and career 
Cox was born in Washington, D.C. She attended the University of South Carolina.

In 1976, Cox was elected to represent the 86th district of the Florida House of Representatives, succeeding Karen B. Coolman. She served until 1982, when she was succeeded by Steve Press.

Cox died in March 2008, at the age of 61.

References 

1946 births
2008 deaths
Politicians from Washington, D.C.
Democratic Party members of the Florida House of Representatives
20th-century American politicians
20th-century American women politicians
20th-century American women
21st-century American women
Women state legislators in Florida
University of South Carolina alumni